KWN or kwn may refer to:

 KWN, the IATA code for Quinhagak Airport, Alaska, United States
 KWN, the Indian Railways station code for Kachewani railway station, Maharashtra, India
 KWN, the National Rail station code for Kilwinning railway station, North Ayrshire, Scotland
 kwn, the ISO 639-3 code for Kwangali language, Namibia and Angola